Karim MH (born 15 February 2004) is an Egyptian football midfielder who plays for UAE Premier League side Ittihad Kalba.

References

External links
 

1989 births
Living people
Egyptian footballers
Association football midfielders
Pyramids FC players